The Blue Bead is a 1974 Turkish comedy film, produced, co-written and directed by Ertem Eğilmez, featuring Turkish classical music singer Emel Sayın as a nightclub singer who is kidnapped by a gang of slackers after they are beaten and thrown out of the club where she works. The film, which went on nationwide general release across Turkey on January 1, 1974, is considered a comedy classic in its homeland.

Cast 
Emel Sayın - Emel Sayın
Tarık Akan - Yakışıklı (Handsome) Necmi
Zeki Alasya - Şeker (Sweet) Kamil
Metin Akpınar - Süleyman (Kanuni)
Halit Akçatepe - Mıstık
Münir Özkul - Baba (Father) Yaşar
Kemal Sunal - Kaymakam (Governor) Cafer
Adile Naşit - Adile

External links 
 

1974 films
1970s Turkish-language films
Films set in Istanbul
1974 comedy films
Films shot in Istanbul
Turkish comedy films